Foscott (also called Foxcote and Foscote) is a hamlet  and is also a civil parish within Aylesbury Vale district in Buckinghamshire, England. At the 2011 Census the population of the hamlet was included in the civil parish of Thornton. In the 20th century a reservoir was built within Foscote, named Foxcote Reservoir.  It is just to the north of Maids Moreton.

The name was Anglo Saxon in origin, meaning "Fox cottage".

Population of Foscott 
In the earliest government census of 1801, there were 85 inhabitants in 17 families living in 17 houses recorded in Foscott.

Rectors of the Parish Church of St Leonard, Foscott 
According to George Lipscomb's 1847 The History and Antiquities of the County of Buckingham there were 39 rectors of the Parish of Foscott, between 1220 and 1840. The church was converted into a private residence in the 1970s.

References

External links

Hamlets in Buckinghamshire
Civil parishes in Buckinghamshire
Aylesbury Vale